Underneath the Arches is a 1937 British comedy film directed by Redd Davis and starring Bud Flanagan, Chesney Allen, Stella Moya, Lyn Harding and Edmund Willard.  Flanagan and Allen formed part of the comedy ensemble known as the Crazy Gang.  It was made by Julius Hagen's Twickenham Studios as part of its ambitious production schedule following its abandonment of quota quickies.

Two down-on-their-luck Englishmen travel by ship to a South American country where they foil one revolution, and then accidentally start another.

Cast
 Bud Flanagan as Bud
 Chesney Allen as Ches
 Stella Moya as Anna
 Lyn Harding as Pedro
 Edmund Willard as Chief Steward
 Enid Stamp-Taylor as Dolores
 Edward Ashley as Carlos
 Aubrey Mather as Professor

References

External links

1937 films
1937 comedy films
British comedy films
Films shot at Twickenham Film Studios
Films directed by Redd Davis
British black-and-white films
Films set in South America
1930s English-language films
1930s British films
English-language comedy films